Steve "Nasty" Anderson 1955-2020 was a well-known retired karate competitor.  Anderson appeared on the covers and in articles in many martial arts magazines and won numerous world championships.  Various sources list different numbers, but On Point magazine claimed he won 10 world titles.  Anderson was a karate kempo stylist  and was a Black Belt Magazine 1982 Competitor of the year.   Anderson got involved in karate in 1969  and received the nickname Nasty from his instructor Chicken Gabriels mother.  One of his students was James Benjamin Stewart.

Competition
Anderson was famous for his backfist and blitz attack  and as a brown belt won 92 consecutive tournaments.  He fought well known individuals like Kevin Thompson and one of his primary rivals was Ray McCallum.  Steve Curran has referred to Anderson as being their toughest opponent.

Death

On January 24, 2020, Steve died at his home in the Ottawa, Ontario suburb of Orleans.

References

American male karateka
Living people
Year of birth missing (living people)